Skywalker 1999 is Kai Tracid's first artist album, released on 4 January 1999.

Track listing

References 

Kai Tracid albums
1999 albums